The Romford Bombers were a speedway team which operated from 1969 until their closure in 1971.

History
In 1969, a team known as the Rochester Bombers started the 1969 British League Division Two season, at Rochester in Kent. However the local council suddenly ruled against planning permission and the clubs promoters Wally Mawdsley and Pete Lansdale were able to use the Brooklands Stadium in Romford, England. The last fixture with the team known as Rochester was on 10 May and as Romford they finished the season in a respectable third place.

The team spent two more seasons in the British League Division Two.

The promotion was quite successful but one vociferous local resident obtained a court order closing the track due to noise pollution. The promotion transferred to the West Ham Stadium and renamed the team the West Ham Bombers for the 1972 season but were forced to close in May of that year after only seven meetings at the stadium in Custom House. Their place in the league was taken by the non-league team running at Barrow-In-Furness, who later renamed themselves as the Barrow Bombers.

Season summary

References

History of the London Borough of Havering
Defunct British speedway teams
Speedway teams in London
Romford